Ulmus davidiana var. davidiana is variety of elm. The tree is restricted to the Chinese provinces of Hebei, Henan, Shaanxi and Shanxi.

Description
The tree has "Bark pale grey to grey. Samara densely pubescent on seed. Fl. and fr. March - May."

Pests and diseases
No information available, but Ulmus davidiana has a moderate, 3 out of 5 resistance.

Cultivation
The tree is very rare in cultivation beyond China.

Accessions

North America
U S National Arboretum , Washington, D.C., United States. (Listed under synonym U. davidiana var. mandshurica) Acc. nos. 76223, 68982.

Nurseries
Europe
Pan-global Plants , Frampton on Severn, Gloucestershire, UK

References

Elm species and varieties
Trees of China
Flora of China
Trees of Asia
Ulmus articles missing images
davidiana var. davidiana